Sherrard is both a surname and a given name. Notable people with the name include:

Surname
Charles Sherrard (1849–1938), English rugby union player
Cherrie Sherrard (born 1938), American hurdler
Danny Sherrard, American poet
Jackie Sherrard
Kathleen Sherrard (1898–1975), Australian geologist and palaeontologist
Mike Sherrard (born 1963), American football player
Patrick Sherrard (1919–1997), English cricketer
Philip Sherrard (1922–1995), British author and scholar of Modern Greek literature
Seán Patrick Michael Sherrard, Irish singer and composer better known as *Johnny Logan, 
Valerie Sherrard, Canadian writer

Given name
Sherrard Clemens (1820–1881), American politician and lawyer

See also
Sherard (name)